WAG Nation is an Australian reality series that was aired on Arena, a subscription television channel. The series follows the lives of five women described as "WAGs", wives and girlfriends of Australian sportsmen.

The first season of WAG Nation premiered on 18 April 2012 and consists of 10 episodes. The cast features Terry Biviano, wife of NRL Sydney Roosters player Anthony Minichiello; event planner Lynette Bolton, wife of AFL Sydney Swans player Jude Bolton; promotions manager Jana Peterson, girlfriend of NRL Cronulla Sharks player John Williams; fashion boutique owner Jackie Spong, wife of AFL North Melbourne player Jarrad Waite; and model/flight attendant Chantelle Raleigh, girlfriend of NBL Gold Coast Blaze player Adam Gibson.

Cast

Reception
The series was criticised for using the term "WAG", although the intention of the show - to focus more on the complexities of the subjects lives than their appearance - was regarded as a strong positive. Commentator Brad Newsome criticised the show as being dull. In describing the first episode, Newsome wrote "You might have imagined that the lives of Australian WAGs (wives and girlfriends of sportsmen) would be terribly exciting. And perhaps they are, but it doesn't seem so in the first episode of this new series.".

See also
The Shire
Freshwater Blue
Stafford Brothers

References

External links
 

Arena (TV network) original programming
2012 Australian television series debuts
2010s Australian reality television series
English-language television shows